Deh-e Sardi (also Romanized as Deh-e Sārdī; also known as Darsārdi and Dasārdi) is a village in Khenaman Rural District, in the Central District of Rafsanjan County, Kerman Province, Iran. At the 2006 census, its population was 29, in 9 families.

References 

Populated places in Rafsanjan County